The Glory Trail is a 1936 American Western film. Directed by Lynn Shores, the film stars Tom Keene, Joan Barclay, and E. H. Calvert. It was released on September 15, 1936.

Cast list
 Tom Keene as Captain John Morgan
 Joan Barclay as Lucy Strong
 E. H. Calvert as Colonel Strong
 Frank Melton as Lieutenant Gilchrist
 William Royle as Captain Fetterman
 Walter Long as Riley
 Allen Greer as Indian Joe
 William Crowell as Wainwright
 Harve Foster as Hampton
 Ann Hovey as Julie Morgan
 John Lester Johnson as Toby
 Etta McDaniel as Mandy
 James Bush as David Kirby

References

External links
 
 

American Western (genre) films
1936 Western (genre) films
1936 films
American black-and-white films
Films directed by Lynn Shores
1930s American films